Ehlinger is a surname. Notable people with the surname include:

Aaron von Ehlinger (born 1987), American former politician and convicted rapist
Ladd Ehlinger Jr. (born 1968), American filmmaker
Maurice Ehlinger (1896–1981), French painter
Nicolas Wagner Ehlinger (born 1992), Luxembourgian dressage rider
Sam Ehlinger (born 1998), American football quarterback